Blue Stream provides cable television, cable telephone, DVR, and up to 1 GIG Internet speed broadband services to customers in the Florida communities of Coral Springs and Weston.

Previously named Coral Springs Cablevision, the Coral Springs portion of the company was purchased by Schurz Communications in 1978 who changed the name to Advanced Cable Communications.

On November 1, 1998, Advanced Cable Communications purchased the portion of their system located in Weston from Gulf & Pacific Communications, L.P.

In August 2016, Schurz sold Advanced Cable Communications to Twin Point Capital and was renamed Blue Stream in February 2017.

References

Cable television companies of the United States
Telecommunications companies of the United States
Companies based in Broward County, Florida
Coral Springs, Florida